Anderson Rodrigues Cardoso also known as Bolívia (born 10 February 1986) is a Brazilian football striker.

Club career

Brazil
Bolívia played his youth career in Internacional, at one time a teammate of a young Alexandre Pato. Later he played for several clubs in Brazil, his last club being EC Taubate.

Perak FA
In November 2013, after signing Burkina Faso player Martin Kafando, Bolívia was given a trial spot with Malaysia Super League team Perak FA to fill its foreign player quota.  Initially Cardoso was given a permanent position after scoring two goals in friendly matches against both Malacca FA and Super Star FC, but after his registration as a foreign player he was rejected by FA Malaysia as he never played in a 1st Division league of any country, Perak chose not to retain him in the squad.

Honors

Club

References

External links
 pafanews.com
 
 Profile at Esporte iG
 

Brazilian footballers
Living people
1986 births
Footballers from Porto Alegre
Sport Club Internacional players
Campeonato Brasileiro Série A players
Esporte Clube Novo Hamburgo players
Associação Desportiva São Caetano players
Campeonato Brasileiro Série B players
Clube Atlético Bragantino players
Esporte Clube Taubaté players
Association football forwards